The Old Library at West Chester University in West Chester, Pennsylvania, USA, is on the prominent corner of South Church Street and West Rosedale Avenue, marking the southwest corner of the Quad. Following the old tradition of the Quad, this 1902 building is made from serpentine rubble stone with a slate roof. The Department of Anthropology and Sociology, as well as the West Chester University Museum of Anthropology and Archaeology, are housed in this facility.

It is a contributing building to the West Chester State College Quadrangle Historic District, listed on the National Register of Historic Places in 1981.

References

Libraries in Pennsylvania
Buildings and structures in Chester County, Pennsylvania
West Chester University
Library buildings completed in 1902
Historic district contributing properties in Pennsylvania
National Register of Historic Places in Chester County, Pennsylvania